The Javan pond heron (Ardeola speciosa) is a wading bird of the heron family, found in shallow fresh and salt-water wetlands in Southeast Asia. Its diet comprises insects, fish, and crabs.

The Javan pond heron is typically 45 cm long with white wings, a yellow bill with a black tip, yellow eyes and legs. Its overall colour is orange, slaty and white during mating season, and brown and flecked with white out of the mating season. The non-breeding plumage is similar to that of the Chinese and Indian pond herons and is virtually indistinguishable in the field. It breeds from June to September. It is migratory.

Widespread throughout its large range, the Javan pond heron is evaluated as Least Concern on the IUCN Red List of Threatened Species.

Gallery

References

External links 

 BirdLife Species Factsheet

Javan pond heron
Javan pond heron
Birds of Southeast Asia
Birds of Java
Javan pond heron